is a Japanese field hockey player. She competed for the Japan women's national field hockey team at the 2016 Summer Olympics.

References

External links
 
 

1994 births
Living people
Sportspeople from Gifu Prefecture
Japanese female field hockey players
Field hockey players at the 2016 Summer Olympics
Field hockey players at the 2020 Summer Olympics
Olympic field hockey players of Japan
Field hockey players at the 2018 Asian Games
Asian Games gold medalists for Japan
Asian Games medalists in field hockey
Medalists at the 2018 Asian Games
Universiade medalists in field hockey
Universiade bronze medalists for Japan
Medalists at the 2013 Summer Universiade
21st-century Japanese women